Andrew Mayer Cohen (born February 2, 1979), better known by his stage name Mayer Hawthorne, is an American singer, producer, songwriter, arranger, audio engineer, DJ, and multi-instrumentalist based in Los Angeles, California. Cohen performs and records in the groups Tuxedo and Jaded Incorporated and has been nominated for a Grammy award.

Early life
Cohen was born and raised in Ann Arbor, Michigan. The stage name "Mayer Hawthorne" is a combination of Cohen's real middle name (Mayer) and Hawthorne Road, the street he grew up on. Cohen is Jewish and had a Bar Mitzvah in 1992 at Temple Beth Emeth in Ann Arbor, Michigan.

Career

Hawthorne started out as a member of the group Athletic Mic League (as DJ Haircut),  based in Ann Arbor,  before moving to Los Angeles in 2005. He was signed to Stones Throw Records by label head Peanut Butter Wolf. Originally the Mayer Hawthorne tracks were created for sampling purposes and for pleasure, but upon hearing them Peanut Butter Wolf insisted they be made into an album. Hawthorne has had no previous vocal training.

His debut single, "Just Ain't Gonna Work Out"/"When I Said Goodbye", was released on a red heart-shaped 7" record on Stones Throw Records on November 4, 2008. His second single "Maybe So, Maybe No"/"I Wish It Would Rain" was released on a 12" record on Stones Throw Records on April 19, 2009. His debut album, A Strange Arrangement was released on CD and LP on Stones Throw Records on September 8, 2009.

The song "When I Said Goodbye", was featured in the Kanye West/Spike Jonze short film We Were Once a Fairytale. In 2011, Hawthorne performed guest vocals for the Sebastian song "Love in Motion" featured on Sebastian's 2011 album Total. On July 15, 2011, Mayer Hawthorne was a guest, along with famed Memphis/Stax Records keyboardist Booker T. Jones, on Episode 43 of Daryl Hall's Live From Daryl's House webcast.  Hawthorne, Hall, and Jones combined with Hall's house band on "Strange Arrangement", "Green Onions", "No Strings", "Just Ain't Gonna Work Out", and "Your Easy Lovin' Ain't Pleasin' Nothin'" and Hall's "You Make My Dreams" and "Private Eyes". During Hall's dinner for the group, Hawthorne stated that, when working as a hip hop DJ, he began recording his own Motown-style tracks to avoid paying fees for sampling other artists' work. He also played all the instruments on each of those tracks, in addition to recording all his own vocals.

Mayer Hawthorne was a musical guest on the Conan TV show on October 17, 2011, and the Late Show with David Letterman on October 25, 2011.  On both shows, the group performed "The Walk", his first single from How Do You Do. In 2012 Hawthorne released the six-track live EP KCRW’s Morning Becomes Eclectic, as a part of Record Store Day's Black Friday.

In late May 2013, Hawthorne released his single "Her Favorite Song" from his album Where Does This Door Go. It is noted that the album is a departure from his throwback style in his past three albums. Later that year, he received a Grammy nomination for "Best Boxed or Special Limited Edition Package" for his album How Do You Do.

Hawthorne performed to mixed reception at the 2014 Bridgestone NHL Winter Classic in Ann Arbor, Michigan.

Musical influences
Mayer Hawthorne is influenced by the music of Curtis Mayfield, Isaac Hayes, Leroy Hutson, Mike Terry, Barry White, Smokey Robinson and the legendary songwriting and production trio of Lamont Dozier, Brian Holland, and Edward Holland, Jr. (known collectively as Holland–Dozier–Holland). Taking umbrage at the notion that his is a purely "throwback" soul sound, however, Hawthorne also cites more contemporary artists, such as J Dilla, Hanne Hukkelberg, and Santigold, as significant influences.

Discussing How Do You Do, Hawthorne says, "I found my own unique sound on this album, which I'm excited about." The album has a vintage sound, which involves twelve '70s inspired tracks, filled with orchestral pop and funky bass lines—"I've taken what I can from the classic heroes of soul and updated it with the music I grew up listening to and loving like Public Enemy and Juan Atkins and Cybotron." He first found his musical voice in hip-hop and rap from his father, who plays in a band in Detroit, Michigan.

In popular culture
In July 2009, Hawthorne was featured on the cover of the third anniversary issue of Beyond Race magazine (BRM).

Hawthorne's song, "Your Easy Lovin' Ain't Pleasin' Nothin'" was included in the fourth season of Ugly Betty in its finale episode, "Hello Goodbye". The song begins in the scene at Betty's goodbye party when Marc asks Troy if he would like to dance.

Hawthorne's track "Do It", released under the alias 'Tuxedo' with Jake One was sampled on Pitbull's track of the same name from his 2013 studio album Global Warming.

The title track from Hawthorne's album, Where Does This Door Go was featured over the closing credits of the season one Masters of Sex episode "Thank You for Coming" in October 2013, and in season two of Netflix's Dear White People during the closing credits of "Chapter VII".

"Love Like That" was included in the video game Forza Horizon 3.

An excerpt of "The Walk" was used in a Blue Moon beer TV commercial in 2017, and in Season 4 episode 10 of the Fox television series Fringe.

"Just Ain't Gonna Work Out" was featured in a scene from the Girls episode "All Adventurous Women Do" (2012).

Discography

References

External links
Mayer Hawthorne on Stones Throw Records

Davy Rothbart Interviews Mayer Hawthorne for Grantland

Stones Throw Records artists
1979 births
Living people
Musicians from Ann Arbor, Michigan
20th-century American Jews
Jewish rappers
Jewish hip hop record producers
Jewish American musicians
American multi-instrumentalists
American hip hop singers
American rhythm and blues singer-songwriters
21st-century American singers
American neo soul singers
American male pop singers
Singer-songwriters from Michigan
21st-century American male singers
21st-century American Jews
American male singer-songwriters